Slovenian Railways is the state railway company of Slovenia.

Electric multiple units

Diesel multiple units

Diesel locomotives

Electric locomotives

References

Rolling stock of Slovenia